Three Days Confined to Barracks is a 1955 West German comedy film directed by Georg Jacoby and starring Ernst Waldow, Grethe Weiser and Eva Probst. It was shot at the Wandsbek Studios in Hamburg. The film's sets were designed by Erich Kettelhut and Johannes Ott. It is a remake of the 1930 comedy film Three Days Confined to Barracks. Like its predecessor it is a comic portrayal of life in the German Army at the beginning of the century.

Cast

References

External links

1950s historical comedy-drama films
German historical comedy-drama films
West German films
Films directed by Georg Jacoby
Remakes of German films
Military humor in film
Films set in the 1900s
1955 comedy films
1955 drama films
German black-and-white films
1950s German films
Films shot at Wandsbek Studios